Samuel Rodmond Smith (April 20, 1841-September 30, 1912) was a Congressional Medal of Honor recipient in the Union Army   
during the U.S. Civil War.  He was an attorney by vocation and became Mayor of Miami near the end of his life.

Medal of Honor Citation
The citation for Smith's Medal of Honor was for an act of bravery at Rowanty Creek, Va on Feb 5, 1865.  It reads: "Swam the partly frozen creek under fire to establish a crossing."
Smith swam the crossing with First Lieutenant  David Eastburn Buckingham, who also earned the award.

Biography
Smith authored a memoir of Judge Leonard Eugene Wales published by the Delaware Historical Society.  At the time he was Clerk of the US Court for the District of Delaware.  He also authored a pamphlet named The reclamation of the Florida Everglades.

Smith owned a 20 Hp Maxwell Briscoe Touring Car, one of the few motor vehicles registered in South Florida in 1907.

He died in Miami in shortly after resigning as the city's 5th Mayor. He willed a generous donation to the YMCA, the Women's Club and the Coconut Grove Library.

See also 

 List of mayors of Miami 
 List of American Civil War Medal of Honor recipients

References

Sources
 Staff, "Miami; Mayor S Rodmond Smith"  Miami Herald, vol. 2, no. 192, 9 June 1912, p. Page Two.

External links 
 https://www.cmohs.org/recipients/samuel-r-smith Congressional Medal of Honor Society
 https://www.findagrave.com/memorial/8050/samuel-rodmond-smith Findagrave
 https://www.hmdb.org/m.asp?m=107936 Historical Marker Database
 http://www.russpickett.com/history/smith.htm Russ Pickett.com
 
Florida lawyers
American Civil War officers
Mayors of Miami
1841 births
1912 deaths